Flyover country and flyover states are American phrases describing the parts of the contiguous United States between the East and the West Coasts. The origins of the phrases and the attitudes of their supposed users are a source of debate in American culture; the terms are often regarded as pejoratives, but are sometimes "reclaimed" and used defensively. The terms refer to the interior regions of the country passed over during transcontinental flights, particularly flights between the nation's two most populous urban agglomerations: the Northeastern Megalopolis and  Southern California.

The term is also sometimes used more broadly to describe flights between all the heavily urbanized megaregions of the United States. The term is often used in reference to the general economic, developmental, cultural, and political differences between the urban coastal and rural central regions of the United States. "Flyover country" thus refers to the part of the country that some Americans—especially those of urban, wealthier, white-collar status—only view by air when traveling and never actually see in person at ground level. 

Although the term is most commonly associated with states located in the geographic center of the country, the states with the most planes flying over without taking off or landing are located on the East Coast, led by Virginia, then Maryland, North Carolina, and Pennsylvania. Others argue that a more effective analysis looks at a state's ratio of flyover flights to destination flights—this places West Virginia first, followed by Kansas, Mississippi, and Iowa.

The circumstances surrounding alleged "flyover country" locations are prone to varying depending on changes related to urban development, business opportunity, and culture.

See also
Middle America
Jesusland
Heartland
Red states and blue states
Central United States
Geography of the United States

References

Further reading 
 
 

Regions of the United States
Political terminology of the United States
Pejorative terms
Regionalism (politics)
Rural society in the United States